Margaret Stewart, Lady Gordon (born 1498) was the daughter of James IV of Scotland and his mistress Margaret Drummond.

Margaret Stewart was born in 1498. Her mother, Margaret Drummond was the daughter of Lord Drummond. The Spanish ambassador Pedro de Ayala reported that the king kept Margaret Drummond in great state in a castle, and afterwards had her married. There is no record of her marriage, but she was given the rents of land in Strathearn. Margaret Drummond died in 1502 and was buried at Dunblane Cathedral. According to a later historian of the Drummond family, William Drummond, Viscount Strathallan, Margaret Drummond and her sisters were poisoned for political reasons by those who feared she might prevent James IV making an advantageous marriage with a foreign princess like Margaret Tudor or the Spanish infanta, Catherine of Aragon. No contemporary evidence for this story has been found.

As a child, and known as "Lady Margaret" she lived at Edinburgh Castle in the care of Sir Patrick Crichton and his wife, Katrine Turing, where her attendants and companions included Marjory Lindsay and the African servants who were called the "More lasses", Margaret and Ellen More.

In February 1505 Lady Margaret started dancing lessons with a drummer called Guilliam. There are records of her clothing, including, in June 1506; a gown of brown or russet cloth bordered with velvet, with velvet sleeves lined with taffeta, a satin kirtle or skirt, a hat and a tippet, a veil of "crisp", and ribbons for her hair.

She married, firstly, John Gordon, Lord Gordon, the son of Alexander Gordon, 3rd Earl of Huntly. Lord Gordon's aunt Catherine Gordon's first husband was Perkin Warbeck. She rode from the lowland royal court north over the Mounth towards Huntly Castle with her servants John Sinclair and Margaret Prestoun on 19 November 1512. It has been suggested that Margaret Prestoun was the sister of Ellen More. Their children included George Gordon, 4th Earl of Huntly and Alexander Gordon (bishop of Galloway).

After Lord Gordon's death, Lady Margaret married Alexander Stewart, apparently a relation of John Stewart, Duke of Albany, and they had a daughter called Margaret who married Lord David Drummond.

She married, thirdly, in 1531, Sir John Drummond of Innerpeffray, and they had five daughters. After their marriage, James V of Scotland made John Drummond Forester of the Royal Forest of Glenartney in Strathearn. A charter making Innerpeffray a free barony in 1536 recognises Margaret Stewart as "sororis regis", the sister of the king.

References

1498 births
15th-century Scottish women
16th-century Scottish women
Illegitimate children of James IV of Scotland
Gordon
African presence at the Scottish royal court
Daughters of kings